Olivier Bernard (26 March 1921 – 1967) was a Swiss hurdler. He competed in the 110 metres hurdles at the 1948 Summer Olympics and the 1952 Summer Olympics.

References

External links
 

1921 births
1967 deaths
Athletes (track and field) at the 1948 Summer Olympics
Athletes (track and field) at the 1952 Summer Olympics
Swiss male hurdlers
Olympic athletes of Switzerland
Place of birth missing